16th ADG Awards
February 4, 2012

Period Film:
Hugo

Fantasy Film:
Harry Potter and the Deathly Hallows – Part 2

Contemporary Film:
The Girl with the Dragon Tattoo

The 16th Art Directors Guild Awards, which were given on February 4, 2012, honored the best production designers of 2011.

Winners and nominees

Film
 Period Film:
 Dante Ferretti – Hugo
 Sebastian Krawinkel – Anonymous
 Laurence Bennett – The Artist
 Mark Ricker – The Help
 Maria Djurkovic – Tinker Tailor Soldier Spy

 Fantasy Film:
 Stuart Craig – Harry Potter and the Deathly Hallows – Part 2
 Robert Stromberg – The Adventures of Tintin: The Secret of the Unicorn
 Rick Heinrichs – Captain America: The First Avenger
 Scott Chambliss – Cowboys & Aliens
 John Myhre – Pirates of the Caribbean: On Stranger Tides

 Contemporary Film:
 Donald Graham Burt – The Girl with the Dragon Tattoo
 Jefferson Sage – Bridesmaids
 Jane Ann Stewart – The Descendants
 Beth Mickle – Drive
 K. K. Barrett – Extremely Loud and Incredibly Close

Television
 One-Hour Single Camera Television Series:
 Bill Groom – Boardwalk Empire (for "21")
 Gemma Jackson – Game of Thrones (for "A Golden Crown")
 Mark Worthington – American Horror Story: Murder House (for "Murder House")
 Scott P. Murphy – The Playboy Club (for "The Scarlet Bunny")
 Bob Shaw – Pan Am (for "Pilot")

Episode of a Half Hour Single-Camera Television Series
 Richard Berg – Modern Family (for "Express Christmas")
 Keith Raywood and Teresa Mastropierro – 30 Rock (for "Double-Edged Sword")
 Joseph P. Lucky – Weeds (for "Game-Played")
 Michael Wylie – Californication (for "Monkey Business")
 Jefferson Sage – New Girl (for "Pilot")

 Multi-Camera Unscripted Series:
 Keith Raywood, Eugene Lee, Akira Yoshimura & N. Joseph DeTullio – Saturday Night Live (for "Host: Justin Timberlake/Lady Gaga")
 Stephan G. Olson – How I Met Your Mother (for "Ducky Tie")
 Glenda Rovello – 2 Broke Girls (for "And the Rich People Problems")
 James Yarnell – American Idol (for "Top 12 Boys Perform")
 James Yarnell – Dancing with the Stars (for "Round One")

 Miniseries or Television Movie:
 Mark Friedberg – Mildred Pierce
 Patti Podesta – Cinema Verite
 Bob Shaw – Too Big to Fail
 Eve Stewart – The Hour
 Robb Wilson King – Bling Ring

External links
The winners and nominees on the official website

2011 film awards
2011 guild awards
Art Directors Guild Awards
2012 in American cinema